Osvaldo Forte (1 June 1919 – 29 July 2005) was an Argentine weightlifter. He competed at the 1948 Summer Olympics and the 1952 Summer Olympics.

References

External links
 

1919 births
2005 deaths
Argentine male weightlifters
Olympic weightlifters of Argentina
Weightlifters at the 1948 Summer Olympics
Weightlifters at the 1952 Summer Olympics
Place of birth missing
Pan American Games medalists in weightlifting
Pan American Games silver medalists for Argentina
Weightlifters at the 1951 Pan American Games
20th-century Argentine people
21st-century Argentine people
Medalists at the 1951 Pan American Games